Elizabeth Stirredge (1634-1706) was a Christian author. She was the author of Strength in weakness manifest in the life, trials and Christian testimony of that faithful servant and handmaid of the Lord. Stirredge was a Quaker. She died in Hempsted, aged 72.

References 

1634 births
1706 deaths
Christian writers